The Ultranet was an online learning management system developed for the Victorian Department of Education and Early Childhood Development in Australia to provide extensive services to students, parents and teachers in government schools. The Ultranet was built by Australian IT firm CSG and phased into school use between 2006 and 2010. Following an audit that found that the Ultranet seriously lacked the features and functionality it was intended to deliver, the Victorian government announced that it would be abandoning support for the system at the end of 2013.

The website, when visited, displays a "Goodbye Ultranet" message and the date the site was officially shut down, 19 December 2013.

Design
The system is designed to provide:
 curriculum content and learning activities
 student, staff and school records
 a reporting system
 a school page
 24 hours a day, 7 days a week access via the Internet for all valid users

Implementation
"The Ultranet" was originally piloted in 22 schools in 2006 under the label 'Student@Centre'.

The system was rolled out to all Victorian government schools throughout 2010.

Ultranet Coaches (Teachers employed to assist in the implementation of the ultranet in DEECD schools) were notified on Friday 6 May 2011 that at the end of that year their positions would no longer exist. Even with the decision not to renew contracts for Ultranet Coaches in Victorian government schools, there remained considerable speculation that DEECD was planning to 'sell off' the Ultranet to other education systems, including the Catholic sector. In addition to online comments and leaks, this speculation was also supported by the position of the Ultranet 'Business Owner'.

Features and Usability
The Ultranet was divided into a number of sections including:
 Learner Profile
 Learning Task
 Design Space
 Collaborative Learning
 Community Space
 Express Space

Teachers could create 'mini sites' on the Ultranet to share information with parents, other teachers and students. Categories for these 'mini sites' came under 'Design', 'Collaborative Learning' and 'Community'. The author of a site on the Ultranet could add the following parts to a page on their site:
 Calendar
 iFrame (loads an external webpage inside the current page)
 Blogs, Wikis and Publications
 Quick note
 Poll
 Slide show
 RSS feed (An external feed, such as latest news from a newspaper site)
 Image Gallery and Reference Library (for uploading documents and files)
 Forum
 A list of members

The user interface and available applications on the Ultranet stemmed from the Student@Center project in 2005.

Criticism
A pupil-free professional development day was planned for 9 August 2010 for teaching staff to learn how to use the Ultranet. However heavy server loads caused the system to crash around 9.00am and teaching was unable to continue. Some schools were reported to have abandoned the training day and staff dismissed early.

There has been further criticism about the Ultranet being an exclusively closed space. While the Ultranet has been designed with online safety as a priority, the lack of modern Web 2.0 tools forces users to embed content from other sources, somewhat undermining the safety and privacy priority. Many schools already have access to other free online learning management systems, including Moodle and Google Apps. Google Apps is available for all schools in Australia, offering cutting edge access to a wide range of Web 2.0 technologies and increased online storage space that the Ultranet can not compete with.

There has also been criticism surrounding the lack of options in 'Learning Tasks', where many other rival Learning Management Systems have more modern and flexible solutions. Learning tasks available in the Ultranet are:
 A URL link
 A text page
 A file submission

Government review of the Ultranet
In December 2012, the secretary of the Education Department, Richard Bolt, announced that the government was "looking at the Ultranet in its entirety... It's a fact, and a well-known fact I think, that the level of take-up of the Ultranet has been nothing like what was intended."

An audit by the Victorian auditor general's office found
"the Ultranet was poorly planned and implemented. Six years after its announcement, it is yet to achieve expected benefits for students, parents and schools. It is significantly late, more than 80 per cent over its first announced budget, has very low uptake, and does not have originally intended functionality."

This audit identified a number of serious probity, procurement and financial management issues surrounding the Ultranet project. DEECD’s tender process lacked rigour and was seriously flawed. There is little confidence in the financial management practices around the Ultranet project, and limited assurance that the selected outcome represented value for money.

In December 2015, the Independent Broad-Based Anti-Corruption Commission announced that an investigation and public hearings would take place with regards to the tendering process of Ultranet.

Government abandonment
In June 2013 the Victorian government announced that it had signed a $2.8 million contract with NEC to continue to support Ultranet until the end of December 2013, after which it would no longer be backed by the government. Schools would then have to pay NEC to use Ultranet, or find other ways to access equivalent functions.
On 19 December 2013 Ultranet was officially taken offline. Some 15 schools which had signed up to use it were migrated to GenEd, NEC's cloud based Ultranet.

References

External links
 Ultranet home page
 DEECD Ultranet page

Virtual learning environments
Education in Victoria (Australia)